Charles Emerson Howe (January 27, 1846 – July 23, 1911) was an American politician who served as the  thirty eighth Mayor of Lowell, Massachusetts.

Early life
Howe was born to John Swain and Mary (Chadwick)  Howe in Gonic, a village in the city of Rochester, New Hampshire, January 27, 1846.

Family life
On January 1, 1884, Howe married  Elizabeth F. Webster  of Lowell, Massachusetts.

Notes

1846 births
1911 deaths
Lowell, Massachusetts City Council members
Mayors of Lowell, Massachusetts
People from Rochester, New Hampshire
People of Massachusetts in the American Civil War
Massachusetts Republicans
19th-century American politicians